Dickson Icefalls are north-draining icefalls of moderate slope at an elevation of , located between Mount Moulton and Mount Bursey in the Flood Range of Marie Byrd Land. They were mapped by the United States Geological Survey from surveys and U.S. Navy air photos, 1959–65, and were named by the Advisory Committee on Antarctic Names for Donald T. Dickson, a United States Antarctic Research Program glaciologist with the Byrd Station Traverse of 1962–63.

References 

Icefalls of Antarctica
Bodies of ice of Marie Byrd Land
Flood Range